Daskotna is a village in Ruen Municipality, in Burgas Province, in southeastern Bulgaria. It has a train station on the Sindel (village) -Karnobat railway, linking it with the towns of Varna, Karnobat and Plovdiv.

References

Villages in Burgas Province